Kosovo has participated in the summer edition of the Youth Olympic Games since 2018 and the winter edition since 2020.

Medal tables

Medals by Summer Games

By sport

Medals by Winter Games

List of medallists

Summer

See also
Kosovo at the Olympics
Kosovo at the Universiade
Sport in Kosovo

References

External links
Olympic Committee of Kosovo

Kosovo at the Youth Olympics
Nations at the Youth Olympic Games
Youth
Youth
Youth sport in Kosovo